Sigmund Freudenberger (16 June 1745 – 15 November 1801) was a Swiss painter and engraver.

Biography
Freudenberger was the son of a lawyer, and studied as a portraitist. He lived from 1765 to 1773 in Paris, where he worked with François Boucher and Jean-Michel Moreau. He then founded in a private art school in Bern and was known as "Little Master" for his genre-like depictions of rural life.

References

 Bloesch.: Freudenberger, Sigmund. In: Allgemeine Deutsche Biographie (ADB). Band 7. Duncker & Humblot, Leipzig 1877, p. 355.

External links
 
 

18th-century Swiss painters
18th-century Swiss male artists
Swiss male painters
1745 births
1801 deaths